Pharyngochromis is a genus of cichlids native to Southern Africa where they are only known from the Zambezi, Okavango, Save–Runde and Kunene basins.

Species and taxonomy
There are currently two recognized species in this genus:

 Pharyngochromis acuticeps (Steindachner, 1866) (Zambezi Bream)
 Pharyngochromis darlingi (Boulenger, 1911) (Zambezi Happy)

A few other, possibly undescribed species are known.

Pharyngochromis, along with Chetia, Sargochromis, Serranochromis and others, form a group sometimes known as the serranochromines or Serranochromini. How many other genera that are included varies, with some defining the group relatively narrowly and others broadly.

References

Haplochromini
 
 
Cichlid genera
Taxa named by Humphry Greenwood